
Gmina Więcbork is an urban-rural gmina (administrative district) in Sępólno County, Kuyavian-Pomeranian Voivodeship, in north-central Poland.

The gmina contains part of the protected area called Krajna Landscape Park.

Villages
Apart from the town of Więcbork, Gmina Więcbork contains the villages and settlements of Adamowo, Borzyszkowo, Czarmuń, Dąbie, Dalkowo, Dorotowo, Dwanaście Apostołów, Frydrychowo, Górowatki, Jastrzębiec, Jeleń, Karolewo, Katarzyniec, Klarynowo, Lubcza, Młynki, Nowy Dwór, Pęperzyn, Puszcza, Runowo Krajeńskie, Runowo-Młyn, Śmiłowo, Suchorączek, Sypniewo, Werski Most, Wilcze Jary, Witunia, Wymysłowo, Zabartowo, Zakrzewek, Zakrzewska Osada and Zgniłka.

Neighbouring gminas
Gmina Więcbork is bordered by the gminas of Lipka, Łobżenica, Mrocza, Sępólno Krajeńskie, Sośno, Zakrzewo and Złotów.

References
Polish official population figures 2006

Wiecbork
Sępólno County